Ocean Girl (titled Ocean Odyssey in the UK) is an Australian science fiction TV series aimed for family audiences and starring Marzena Godecki as the lead character. The show is set in the near future, and focuses on an unusual girl named Neri who lives alone on an island, and the friendships she develops with the inhabitants of an underwater research facility called ORCA (Oceanic Research Centre of Australia) the show is an example of deep ecology science fiction.

Ocean Girl inspired an animated series, The New Adventures of Ocean Girl, which ran from 2000 to 2001 and has since been released on DVD. The animated series is in a distinct reboot separate from the original live-action show.

Plot
Neri is a young girl with an affinity for water, the ability to swim long distances and super-human lung capacity. She lives alone on an otherwise deserted island, and sleeps in a nest in a tree. Early in the first season, Neri befriends two Australian boys; Jason & Brett Bates. The Bates brothers live in an elaborate underwater research and environmental protection facility called ORCA (Oceanic Research Center of Australia) located near Port Douglas, Queensland. At the beginning of the series, their mother, Dr. Dianne Bates, has been assigned to ORCA to study whale song in the hopes of facilitating cross-species communication. A significant portion of the series takes place on ORCA itself, and looks at the activities of its inhabitants, which includes the school-aged children of the resident scientists, such as Jason and Brett. Jason discovers Neri while on a whale-tracking expedition with his mother. While attempting to tag a whale using a harpoon from the boat, Jason is startled by a girl (Neri) who appears in the water and positions herself between Jason and the whale, saying "No, no!", Jason freezes and fails to release the harpoon. Dr. Bates rushes out to the ship's deck, grabs the harpoon and tags the whale, albeit missing the intended target area. Dr. Bates is furious with Jason and doesn't believe his story about a girl appearing in the water. No one believes Jason at first and he is ridiculed by the other children on ORCA. Brett is the second character to know of Neri's existence. Brett and Jason's friendship with Neri is at first a highly guarded secret due to Neri's fear of other humans.

As the series progresses, it is revealed that Neri came to Earth on a spaceship with her father when she was young, though his death soon after the ship's crash left Neri to fend for herself. Prior to meeting Jason and Brett, Neri's only friend was a humpback whale (a jali in Neri's native tongue) whom she names "Charlie" and with whom she can communicate. Later in the series, Neri's curiosity leads her to explore ORCA, while Dr. Bates's study of Charlie's whale song helps her identify Neri as the intended recipient of that song. Eventually, Dr Bates and her assistant, Dr. Winston Seth, become embroiled in Jason and Brett's effort to keep Neri a secret, while also performing numerous tests on Neri to understand how she's able to communicate with whales.

At the same time that the Bates family learn about Neri, a rival research organisation, the UBRI Corporation, are introduced. Headed by the sinister Dr. Hellegren, UBRI have learned that a spacecraft landed somewhere in the vicinity of ORCA, and begin their own search for any personnel that may have survived. Simultaneously, they work on other projects which threaten the natural ecology of the ocean around ORCA. Eventually, they put in play an effort to build the so-called "ORCA City", an elaborate underwater construction that will likely eradicate much of the natural life on the seabed. In response, Dr. Bates's mission changes over the course of the series from cetologist to environmental protectionist. This role becomes more prominent beginning with the third season, when UBRI representatives establish themselves on board ORCA. Accordingly, the series shifts to a more serious tone in its later seasons.

As Neri gradually discovers more of her island and ORCA, she also begins to understand her greater purpose. This self-awakening is particularly enhanced by encounters with others of her kind. In the second season, she discovers her sister, Mera, and the two are given the opportunity to return to their home planet. Mera avails herself of this option, but Neri stays, feeling that she must discover what her father was trying to do on Earth. In the third season, she gains entry into the downed spacecraft that originally brought her to Earth. There, she finds another of her people in suspended animation. The new character, Kal, proves to be the son of the commander of the vessel, and helps her tap into the ship's memory core. She finds the ship's log, in which Kal's mother explains that Neri's father was to repair the damage done to Earth's oceans with an advanced device called the Synchronium. She then dedicates her life to her father's cause, giving her a genuine sense of purpose that she had perhaps lacked earlier in the series. Kal grows jealous of the strong bond between Neri and Jason Bates, and begins hating Neri's friends on ORCA. As protest, Kal leaves the island. Neri and her ORCA mates go looking for him, but are unable to find him as he's been captured by UBRI. UBRI tricks Kal into believing that the male should lead (as he had been indoctrinated into the matriarchal social mores of his people), and he creates an alliance with Dr. Hellegren to steal the Synchronium pieces that Neri and Mera have hidden in a secret cave.

While the primary cast gets new motivations by UBRI's move to ORCA and Kal's appearance on the island, the secondary cast radically changes at the outset of the third season. All of the original kids are replaced by a new crew, and more adults are added to the ORCA staff.

As Neri begins her father's mission, she is drawn farther and farther away from her island. Beginning in the middle of the third season, some episodes are primarily based on land. By the fourth season, some episodes are set in Egypt, and her father's quest eventually leads her back to the "Ocean Planet", her home planet. Most of the plots involving the secondary kids on ORCA are reduced in the final season, in order to allow for greater exploration of Neri's home world. Several new characters of Neri's species are introduced. Likewise, the threat of UBRI fades, to be replaced by a new organization, PRAXIS (Preventative Response and eXtraterritorial Intelligence Service) and by rebels on the Ocean Planet. This group is dedicated to protecting against any threats posed by extraterrestrial life, and its agents come to believe Neri and her people are a problem for Earth. They thus chased Neri and the Bates boys around the world. When a mysterious underwater pyramid is discovered in the ocean, Neri and the Bates boys enter it and discover more about the Ocean Planet, and Neri's mission on Earth.

When the rebellion in the Ocean World is growing, Mera escapes to Earth and is reunited with Neri. But PRAXIS sees this pyramid as a danger to the Earth. Much of the final season is thus concerned with PRAXIS' attempt to attack the pyramid, as well as with a "Red Virus" which is spreading in the oceans of Neri's home world, the Ocean Planet. Eventually, in the series finale, Jason, Brett, and Neri are able to repulse PRAXIS' efforts and the rebellion, and Earth is saved. Neri remains on Earth as the ambassador of the Ocean Planet, and she and Jason finally become a couple.

The Bates family, Winston, Neri, Charlie, and the ORCA computer H.E.L.E.N. (Hydro Electronic Liaison ENtity) are the only constant characters for the show's entire run. However, the part of Dr. Bates is recast with Liz Burch after the second season and H.E.L.E.N. is "upgraded" in the fourth and final season.

Cast

Main cast

Marzena Godecki as Neri (seasons 1–4)
David Hoflin as Jason Bates (seasons 1–4)
Jeffrey Walker as Brett Bates (seasons 1–4)
Alex Pinder as Dr. Winston Seth (seasons 1–4)
Kerry Armstrong as Dr Dianne Bates (seasons 1–2)
Liz Burch as Dr. Dianne Bates (seasons 3–4)
Nicholas Bell as Dr. Hellegren (seasons 1–3)
Lauren Hewett as Mera (seasons 2–4)
Jeremy Angerson as Kal (season 3)
Brooke "Mikey" Anderson as Cassandra "Cass" Clayborn (season 3–4)
Gregory Ross as Paul Bates (season 4)
Tharini Mudaliar as Shersheba (season 4)
Rhona Rees as Ilona (season 4)
Terry Serio as Captain Phillips (season 2)

While Ocean Girl featured the ensemble cast listed above, there were several characters who appeared for one season each, with four children appearing in two seasons each (three in Seasons 1 and 2, one in Seasons 3 and 4) as well as a few adults appearing in more than one season. Most of the cast changes were explained by their "friends" (or rather, their parents) having been transferred back to shore, with the exception of Season 4, where it was not noted at all.

Other cast
Pamela Rabe as Commander Byrne
Joel De Carteret as Froggy 
Cassandra Magrath as Zoe 
Jacalyn Prince as Vanessa 
Joelene Crnogorac as Lena Hellegren
William McInnes as Commander Lucas (season 1)
Verity McIntyre as Morgan Clayborn

Episodes

Broadcast history

The original Ocean Girl series ran on Australia's Network Ten between 1994 and 1997. Internationally, it was broadcast by The Disney Channel in the United States, Discovery Kids in the United Kingdom, YTV and Radio-Canada in Canada, TV Nova and Supermax in the Czech Republic, Sri Lanka Rupavahini Corporation in Sri Lanka, TRT 1 in Turkey, TSI in the Italian part of Switzerland, ZDF and KI.KA in Germany, on RTÉ One and RTÉ Two in Ireland, on RTL 4 in the Netherlands, on (TV2) in Denmark, on NRK and TV2 in Norway, on Fox Kids in Latin America, on TVP 1 (Poland), on TV4 in Sweden, on Canal Panda in Portugal, on Arutz HaYeladim and IETV in Israel, on ZBC in Zimbabwe, on ATV World in Hong Kong, on TV3 in Malaysia, on Channel 2 in Jordan, on Sjónvarpið in Iceland, on Premiere 12 in Singapore, on KBC in Kenya, on NBC in Namibia, on IBC in Thailand, France 2 and Canal J in France, on Duna in Hungary, TV3 in Ghana, on DTV Channel 8 in Guyana and on Channel 33 in the United Arab Emirates. The Disney Channel began airing the series on 3 October 1994, but only aired the first three seasons; the last was not broadcast. Discovery Kids regularly broadcast all four seasons in continuous loops until 2003. The first two series were also broadcast in South Africa by the SABC at the same time as in Australia.

In the UK, the show was broadcast under the title Ocean Odyssey on BBC Two. It was aired in 1996, with a subsequent re-airing in 2002, although for unknown reasons this airing halted before Season 4 was complete. In 2004, the entire series was re-aired in full.

In Vietnam, it was aired on VTV3 twice through from 1998 to 1999 and had a total 81 episodes (instead of 78). It is unknown why this was done, but presumably scenes from several episodes were edited out and made into extra installments.

In recent years, the show was repeated on the ABC in Australia, as part of their ABC Kids afternoon block of children's programs. The series began airing in 2011 on children's channel ABC3.

In Perth, the series screens on West TV on Sundays at 5:30pm, with encore screenings the following Saturday at 11:30am.

Critical reception
Common Sense Media gave the show a rating of 4 out of 5 stars, saying "The plot is almost as complex and twisty [as Lost]...the action is crackling and nonstop, the mysteries are many, and the lead character, Neri, is enchanting. Any scenes where she appears are pretty much guaranteed to be cool." The show was given a user rating of 8.3 out of 10 on TV.com based on 132 votes.

DVD releases 
All four seasons of the series have been released on DVD by Umbrella Entertainment in Australia (region 4).

Box sets

Ocean Girl: A New Generation
It was announced in 2013 among Johnathan M. Shiff Productions' upcoming series projects included a Series titled Ocean Girl: A New Generation. No further information is known as to how it will relate to the original series.

See also
 Naagin
 H2O: Just Add Water
 Mako: Island of Secrets

References

External links
 Ocean Girl at the Australian Television Information Archive
 
 Jonathan M. Shiff Productions, includes an Ocean Girl section
 Ocean Girl at the National Film and Sound Archive

Australian children's television series
Australian adventure television series
Australian science fiction television series
Fictional activists
Television series about extraterrestrial life
Fictional mermen and mermaids
Television series about orphans
Mermaids in television
Network 10 original programming
Disney Channel original programming
English-language television shows
Television shows set in Queensland
1994 Australian television series debuts
1997 Australian television series endings
Television series about teenagers
Television series by Beyond Television Productions
BAFTA winners (television series)
Underwater civilizations in fiction